Sir John de Seton was an English knight, whose sons fought on the side of Robert the Bruce, Earl of Carrick and later King of Scotland and were executed for treason.

Life
Seton held the manor of Seton, in Yorkshire, and the manors and lands of Gamelsby, Unthank and Lambynby, and the lands of Seaton in Cumbria. King Edward I of England pardoned Robert Bruce, Lord of Annandale, and Seton for poaching in the King's forest at Inglewod. He performed fealty to Edward I at Berwick on 28 August 1296, for his Scottish lands. He died in 1299, an inquisition nominating his son Christopher as heir.

Marriage and issue
John married Erminia, daughter of Thomas de Lascelles, Lord of Bolton, they had the following known issue:
Christopher Seton (executed 1306), married Christina Bruce.
John Seton (executed 1306)
Humphrey Seton (executed 1306)

Citations

References

Year of birth unknown
1299 deaths
13th-century English people
Medieval English knights